The 6th Louisiana Infantry Regiment served in the Confederate States Army during the American Civil War.  It was part of the Louisiana Tigers.  Formed in June 1861 at Camp Moore, it fought in Jackson's Valley campaign, the Battle of Gaines Mill, the Second Battle of Bull Run and its related actions, and the Battle of Antietam in 1862.  The next year, it fought at the Second Battle of Fredericksburg, the Battle of Salem Church, the Second Battle of Winchester, and the Battle of Gettysburg before being overrun at the Second Battle of Rappahannock Station.  It spent 1864 fighting in Grant's Overland campaign and with Jubal Early in the Valley campaigns of 1864.  The regiment fought in the Battle of Hatcher's Run and the Battle of Fort Stedman in early 1865 before surrendering after the Battle of Appomattox Court House in April.  It began its service with 916 men and ended with 52.

Service history
The regiment was organized into Confederate service for action in the American Civil War on 4 June 1861, at Camp Moore in the state of Louisiana.  Its 916 men were organized into 10 companies designated with the letters A–I and K.  Most of the companies were organized in Orleans Parish, although Company D was from Tensas Parish, Company C from St. Landry Parish, and Company A from Union Parish and Sabine Parish.  The unit's first colonel was Isaac Seymour, its first lieutenant colonel was Louis Lay, and its first major was Samuel L. James.  Over half of the unit's men with known places of birth were born outside of the United States, primarily from Ireland.  In its early days, the unit had a reputation for being disorderly and hard to control; Seymour had to publicly rebuke several officers in late 1861 for drunkenness.

Sent to the fighting in Virginia and stationed at Centreville, the regiment guarded supplies and was not involved in the First Battle of Bull Run on 21 July.  In August, it was added to a brigade commanded by W. H. T. Walker consisting of the 7th Louisiana Infantry Regiment, the 8th Louisiana Infantry Regiment, the 9th Louisiana Infantry Regiment, and the 1st Louisiana Special Battalion.  The brigade spent the next winter in the vicinity of Centreville, and Orange Court House before being transferred to the Shenandoah Valley in early 1862, where it fought under Stonewall Jackson.  James resigned on 1 December 1861, and was replaced by George W. Christy, who was dropped from the regiment's rolls on 9 May 1862 and replaced with Arthur MacArthur.  Lay resigned on 13 February, and was replaced by Henry B. Strong.

On 23 May, the regiment saw action in the Battle of Front Royal, and captured two Union battle flags in a skirmish at Middletown the next day.  25 May saw the regiment engaged in the First Battle of Winchester, where MacArthur was killed, and on 9 June it fought in the Battle of Port Republic, in which 66 of its men were killed or wounded.  MacArthur's role as major was then filled by Nathaniel G. Offutt.  After Port Republic, Jackson's men were transferred to the Virginia Peninsula to take part in the Seven Days battles, and the 6th Louisiana skirmished at Hundley's Corner on 26 June before fighting in the Battle of Gaines Mill the next day.  Seymour led the brigade at Gaines Mill, since Richard Taylor was ill.  The Louisianans, known as the Louisiana Tigers, became bogged down in Boatswain's Swamp, were repulsed with loss, and withdrew from the battle.  Seymour was killed during the charge, and was replaced by Strong.  Offutt took over Strong's position as lieutenant colonel, and William Monaghan became colonel.

Moving north with Jackson in August, it fought at Bristoe Station, Virginia on 26 August, in the Battle of Kettle Run the next day. At Kettle Run, the regiment held off a Union advance while the 8th Louisiana burned a bridge, and then the two regiments, joined by the 60th Georgia Infantry Regiment and the 5th Louisiana Infantry Regiment, fought against the Union Excelsior Brigade and the brigade of Colonel Joseph B. Carr. It then fought in the Second Battle of Bull Run on 29 and 30 August.  At Second Bull Run, it was part of the brigade of Colonel Henry Forno.  On the first day of the battle, Forno's brigade helped repulse James Nagle's Union brigade.  On the morning on 30 August, it was sent to the rear for supplies and would not rejoin the fighting that day.

After Second Bull Run, the 6th Louisiana fought in the Battle of Chantilly on 1 September, where the Louisiana brigade was routed with the 5th, 6th, 8th, and 14th Louisiana regiments suffering the heaviest casualties in the Confederate army, and on 17 September saw action in the Battle of Antietam.  At Antietam, the regiment was part of Harry T. Hays's brigade.  During the fighting, Hays's brigade charged towards the Miller Cornfield and was cut to pieces, with the brigade suffering 61 percent casualties.  The 6th Louisiana lost 52 men killed or wounded, including Colonel Strong, who was killed and replaced with Offutt. All 12 officers of the 6th Louisiana that saw action at Antietam were killed or wounded.  Monaghan became lieutenant colonel and was replaced as major by Joseph Hanlon. Offutt in turn resigned on 7 November, and was replaced by Monaghan.  Hanlon became lieutenant colonel, and Manning was promoted to major.  The regiment was held in reserve at the Battle of Fredericksburg on 13 December and was not directly engaged, although it did come under Union artillery fire.

An inspection in January 1863 rated the 6th Louisiana as having "poor" discipline and moderately good at performance in drills. Along with the 5th Louisiana Infantry, the regiment contested a Union crossing of the Rappahannock River on 29 April 1863.  Union troops were able to force a crossing, and the 6th Louisiana had 7 men killed, 12 wounded, and 78 captured.  It then fought in the Second Battle of Fredericksburg on 3 May, where 27 of the unit's men were captured.  While part of the regiment was captured, most of the unit was able to withdraw from the field in better condition than the other Confederate units positioned near it.  It then fought at the Battle of Salem Church the next day.  Altogether, the 6th Louisiana Infantry sustained losses of 14 killed, 68 wounded, and 99 captured at the Battle of Chancellorsville. It next saw combat on 14 June, in the Second Battle of Winchester, where it joined its brigade of other Louisiana units in capturing a Union fort.

At the Battle of Gettysburg on 1–3 July, the 6th Louisiana was still in Hays' brigade.  On 1 July, the brigade was part of a Confederate charge that swept the Union XI Corps from the field, although it was less heavily engaged than some of the other participating Confederate brigades.  Entering the town of Gettysburg, the brigade captured large numbers of disorganized Union troops.  On the evening of the following day, the brigade was part of a failed attack against the Union position on Cemetery Hill.  It then spent 3 July, the final day of the battle, skirmishing. 
The Confederates, who were defeated at Gettysburg, withdrew from the field on 4 July.  The regiment took 232 men into the fighting at Gettysburg, and suffered 61 casualties.

Back in Virginia, the 6th Louisiana fought in the Bristoe campaign in October and was overrun in the Second Battle of Rappahannock Station on 7 November, losing 89 men captured.  In the spring of 1864, it fought in Grant's Overland campaign.  On 5 May, in the Battle of the Wilderness, the regiment helped repulse a Union attack, after Hays' brigade had been repulsed and badly bloodied earlier in the battle.  It then fought in the Battle of Spotsylvania Court House on 9 May through 19.  On 12 May, the regiment was part of its brigade's fighting at the Mule Shoe.  The brigade was badly wrecked at the Mule Shoe, and only 60 men were present at the 6th Louisiana's roll call the next morning.  From June through October, it was detached as part of Jubal Early's command to fight in the Valley campaigns of 1864. Monaghan was killed in battle on 28 August, or 25 August, and was not replaced as colonel.  At the Battle of Cedar Creek in October, one company of the 6th Louisiana saw both men present shot.  After the battle, the 5th, 6th, and 7th were consolidated into a single company when the brigade was reorganized due to severe losses. In November, the regiment was consolidated into a single company and was combined with the 5th Louisiana and the 7th Louisiana, as it had been reduced to a very small strength.  Taking part in the Siege of Petersburg, the 6th Louisiana's survivors fought at the Battle of Hatcher's Run on 6 February 1865, and at the Battle of Fort Stedman on 25 March.  The 6th Louisiana's remnants ended their military service when Robert E. Lee's Confederate army surrendered on 9 April, after the Battle of Appomattox Court House.  At the time of the surrender, the 6th Louisiana had been reduced to 52 officers and men.  Over the course of its existence, 1,146 men served in the unit.  Of that total, 219 were combat deaths, 104 died of disease, one man drowned, five died accidentally, one man was executed, and at least 232 deserted.  Desertions were particularly heavy in three companies that primary consisted of men born outside of the United States.

References

Sources
 
 
 
 
 
 
 
 
 
 
 

Units and formations of the Confederate States Army from Louisiana
Military units and formations established in 1861
Military units and formations disestablished in 1865
1861 establishments in Louisiana
1865 disestablishments in Virginia